Marshall and Ross Von Erich are an American professional wrestling tag team, consisting of brothers Marshall and Ross Adkisson. They are the sons of Kevin Von Erich. They are currently signed to Major League Wrestling, where they are former World Tag Team Champions.

Professional wrestling career
They made their debut for Pro Wrestling Noah on July 22, 2012. In July 2017, Marshall and Ross along with their father Kevin, wrestled at the Rage Megashow in Israel.

The brothers later made their national television debut as part of the Total Nonstop Action Wrestling (TNA) Slammiversary XII PPV on June 15, 2014 in a tag match defeating The BroMans via disqualification. They also made various appearances on TNA Xplosion including the April 1, 2015 episode defeating the team of Sonjay Dutt and John Yurnet. and losing to The Revolution members James Storm and Manik on the July 1, 2015 episode. Marshall and Ross later rematched The Revolution at the TNA One Night Only Gut Check event on September 15, 2015 in a losing effort.

In May 2019, Ross and Marshall signed a multi-year contract with Major League Wrestling (MLW). On November 2, 2019, Marshall and Ross Von Erich defeated The Dynasty (Maxwell Jacob Friedman and Richard Holliday) to become the new MLW World Tag Team Champions at MLW Saturday Night SuperFight.

On July 31, 2022, the Von Erich brothers lost to Mark and Jay Briscoe via pinfall, at the "Ric Flair's last match" pay-per-view in Nashville Tennessee.

Personal life
They are the sons of former professional wrestler Kevin Von Erich making them members of the Von Erich Family. Their grandfather was Fritz Von Erich and their uncles were professional wrestlers David Von Erich, Kerry Von Erich, Mike Von Erich, and Chris Von Erich. They are cousins of former professional wrestler and current promoter Lacey Von Erich.

Championships and accomplishments
 Action Zone Wrestling
 AZW Tag Team Championship (1 time)
 Imperial Wrestling Revolution
IWR Tag Team Championship (1 time)
 Major League Wrestling
 MLW World Tag Team Championship (1 time)

References

External links
 Ross Von Erich – MLW Profile
 Marshall Von Erich – MLW Profile

Impact Wrestling teams and stables
Independent promotions teams and stables
Major League Wrestling teams and stables
Pro Wrestling Noah teams and stables